The Hoonigan Racing Division is a motor racing team that competes in the American Rally Association. The team previously competed in the World Rally Championship, Global RallyCross Championship, FIA World Rallycross Championship and Rally America.

History 
The team was formed by Ken Block as Monster World Rally Team at the beginning of 2010 as a platform for him to compete at world championship level. The team, sponsored by Monster Energy, ran a 2011-spec Ford Fiesta RS WRC for Block and co-driver Alex Gelsomino at selected events in the World Rally Championship. At the Global Rallycross, Block finished fifth in 2012, third in 2013, second in 2014 and seventh in 2015. Block also claimed a third-place finish and a fourth at the 2014 World Rallycross Championship.

In 2016, Block competed full-time in the FIA World Rallycross Championship alongside Andreas Bakkerud. He drove a Ford Focus RS, built and run by M-Sport, a British motorsport team, who also build and prepare the cars for every rally team and several rallycross teams competing with the Fiesta model.

On September 4, 2017, Ford Performance and Hoonigan Racing Division announced their withdrawal from the World Rallycross Championship after the 2017 season.

Racing record
Legend

Complete FIA World Rally Championship results

Complete FIA World Rallycross Championship results

Supercar

† Five championship points deducted for receiving three reprimands in a season.

Complete FIA European Rallycross Championship results

Supercar

Complete Global Rallycross Championship results
(key)

Supercar

Gallery

See also
 Gymkhana Grid

References

External links
 Official website - Hoonigan Racing Division
 Official website - Hoonigan

Ford Team RS
World Rally Championship teams
Global RallyCross Championship teams
World Rallycross Championship teams